Forges-les-Eaux is a commune in the Seine-Maritime department in the Normandy region in northern France. On 1 January 2016, the former commune of Le Fossé was merged into Forges-les-Eaux.

Geography

History
Known as "De Forgis" in 1186, the first part of the name, Forges, is derived from the fact that it was an important centre for the mining and manufacturing of iron in Roman times.
The second part of its name comes from the therapeutic use of the thermal waters from the sixteenth century onwards. 
A seigneur from Forges took part in the Battle of Hastings and another took part in the First Crusade. 
During the Hundred Years War, a certain Philippe de Forges was killed in 1356 at the Battle of Poitiers. Years later, but in the same conflict, the English besieged the castle and took the town, in 1418.  
Blanche d'Evreux, widow of Philippe VI of France, came here to take the waters in the fourteenth century, but it was the Chevalier de Varenne who really began the vogue in 1573.
The spa became famous after the stay from 21 June to 13 July 1632 of Louis XIII, Anne of Austria and Cardinal Richelieu.  Because of the royal visit, the parks, gardens and many water sources were developed, including three lakes that still exist today. Subsequently, many famous figures from French history have taken the waters. In 1657, the Regent Doctor of the Faculty of Medicine in Paris, Pierre Cressé, wrote a thesis on the waters of Forges which he compared to those of Passy then the chemist Gilles-François Boulduc, apothecary to King Louis XIV, studied their composition.
A large pottery factory was active from 1797 to the end of the nineteenth century. 
The casino was first built in the nineteenth century but destroyed by fire in 1896. It was rebuilt and reopened in 1902.

1906 saw the first (in France) annual butter conventions.

The railway station was opened in the nineteenth century and runs a TER service to Gisors and Dieppe.

The film "Poulet au vinaigre" (1985) by Claude Chabrol, with Stephane Audran (Released in the US as "Cop au Vin,") was filmed in Forges-les-Eaux.[Film credits]

Heraldry

Population

Places of interest
 The nineteenth century church of St. Eloi.
 A seventeenth century Carmelite convent.
 A feudal motte.
 The casino.
 The château de la Minière.
 Three museums.
 A 45 km paved bicycle path along a disused rail line to Dieppe

Notable people
Jean Le Chapelier, politician, lived here.

Twin towns
 Battice, Herve, in Belgium since 1960.
 Heathfield, East Sussex, in England.
 Wennigsen, Lower Saxony, in Germany since 1997.

See also
Communes of the Seine-Maritime department

References

External links

Official Forges-les-Eaux website 
Commerce website of Forges-les-Eaux 
Site of the Office de Tourisme 
Station Verte of Forges-les-Eaux 

Communes of Seine-Maritime